Lydia Ernestine Becker (24 February 1827 – 18 July 1890) was a leader in the early British suffrage movement, as well as an amateur scientist with interests in biology and astronomy. She established Manchester as a centre for the suffrage movement and with Richard Pankhurst she arranged for the first woman to vote in a British election and a court case was unsuccessfully brought to exploit the precedent. Becker is also remembered for founding and publishing the Women's Suffrage Journal between 1870 and 1890.

Biography
Born in Cooper Street, Manchester, the oldest daughter of Hannibal Becker, whose father, Ernst Becker had emigrated from Ohrdruf in Thuringia. Becker was educated at home, like many girls at the time. Intellectually curious, she studied botany and astronomy from the 1850s onwards, winning a gold medal for an 1862 scholarly paper on horticulture. An uncle, rather than her parents, encouraged this interest. Five years later, she founded the Ladies' Literary Society in Manchester.

She began a correspondence with Charles Darwin and soon afterwards convinced him to send a paper to the society. In the course of their correspondence, Becker sent a number of plant samples to Darwin from the fields surrounding Manchester. She also forwarded Darwin a copy of her "little book", Botany for Novices (1864). Becker is one of a number of 19th-century women who contributed, often routinely, to Darwin's scientific work. Her correspondence and work alike suggest that Becker had a particular interest in bisexual and hermaphroditic plants which, perhaps, offered her powerful 'natural' evidence of radical, alternative sexual and social order.

She was also recognised for her own scientific contributions, being awarded a national prize in the 1860s for a collection of dried plants prepared using a method that she had devised so that they retained their original colours. She gave a botanical paper to the Biology Section (D) at the 1868 meeting of the British Association about the effect of fungal infection on sexual development in a plant species. Botany remained important to her, but her work for women's suffrage took over the central role in her life. Her involvement in promoting and encouraging scientific education for girls and women brought these two aspects together.

Role in women's suffrage 

In autumn 1866 Becker attended the annual meeting of the National Association for the Advancement of Social Science, where she was excited by a paper from Barbara Bodichon entitled "Reasons for the Enfranchisement of Women". She dedicated herself to organising around the issue, and in January 1867 convened the first meeting of the Manchester Women's Suffrage Committee, one of the first organisations of its kind in England. She got to know there Dr. Richard Pankhurst, known as 'the red Doctor' whom Becker described as 'a very clever little man with some extraordinary sentiments about life in general and women in particular'. He married Emmeline in 1879.

Several months later, a widowed shop owner, Lilly Maxwell, mistakenly appeared on the register of voters in Manchester. She was not the first but she was a good opportunity for publicity. Becker visited Maxwell and escorted her to the polling station. The returning officer found Maxwell's name on the list and allowed her to vote. Becker immediately began encouraging other women heads of households in the region to petition for their names to appear on the rolls. Their claims were presented in court by Sir John Coleridge and Richard Pankhurst in Chorlton v. Lings, but the case was dismissed.
 
On 14 April 1868, the first public meeting of the National Society for Women's Suffrage was held in the Free Trade Hall in Manchester. The three main speakers were Agnes Pochin, Anne Robinson and Becker. The meeting was presided over by Priscilla Bright McLaren. Becker moved the resolution that women should be granted voting rights on the same terms as men.

Becker subsequently commenced a lecture tour of northern cities on behalf of the society. In June 1869, Becker and fellow campaigners were successful in securing the vote for women in municipal elections. Having campaigned for the inclusion of women on school boards, in 1870 she was one of four women elected to the Manchester School Board on which she served until her death. In the same year Becker and her friend Jessie Boucherett founded the Women's Suffrage Journal and soon afterward began organising speaking tours of women – a rarity in Britain at the time. At an 1874 speaking event in Manchester organised by Becker, fifteen-year-old Emmeline Pankhurst experienced her first public gathering in the name of women's suffrage. On 24 March 1877 Lydia appeared at a public meeting alongside J.W White, Henry Birchenough, Alice Cliff Scatcherd (subsequently one of the co-founders of the Women's Franchise League) and other early suffragists to discuss women's access to the vote in Macclesfield.

The Journal was the most popular publication relating to women's suffrage in 19th-century Britain. Roger Fulford, in his study of the movement Votes for Women: The Story of a Struggle, writes: "The history of the decades from 1860 to 1890 – so far as women's suffrage is concerned – is the history of Miss Becker." The Journal published speeches from around the country, both within and outside of Parliament. Becker published her correspondence with her supporters and her opponents, notably in 1870, when she chastised the MP for Caernarvonshire after he voted against a proposal offering women the vote.

In 1880, Becker and co-workers campaigned in the Isle of Man for the right of women to vote in the House of Keys elections. Unexpectedly, they were successful and they secured for women voting rights in the Isle of Man for the first time in the elections of March 1881. Becker became the chair of the Central Committee of the National Society for Women's Suffrage. This organisation had been formed in 1871 to lobby parliament. Other committee members included Helen Blackburn, Millicent Fawcett, Jessie Boucherett, Eva McLaren, Margaret Bright Lucas, Priscilla Bright McLaren and Frances Power Cobbe.

Becker differed from many early feminists in her disputation of essentialised femininity. Arguing there was no natural difference between the intellect of men and women, Becker was a vocal advocate of a non-gendered education system in Britain. She also differed with many suffrage activists in arguing more strenuously for the voting rights of unmarried women. Women connected to husbands and stable sources of income, Becker believed, were less desperately in need of the vote than widows and single women. This attitude made her the target of frequent ridicule in newspaper commentary and editorial cartoons.

Death and legacy 
In 1890 Becker visited the spa town of Aix-les-Bains, where she fell ill and died of diphtheria, aged 63.

Rather than continue publishing in her absence, the staff of the Women's Suffrage Journal decided to cease production.

Memorials

A book collection by women, with books from Helen Blackburn's collection, her friends and from second hand sources, was placed in two bookcases decorated with paintings of Becker and Caroline Ashurst Biggs, who had been chairs of the Central Committee of the National Society for Women's Suffrage before Blackburn. These bookcases were given to Girton College and are extant.

Becker's name is listed on the south face of the Reformers Memorial in Kensal Green Cemetery in London. Her name is also listed on her father's gravestone (Hannibal Becker) in the churchyard of the Parish Church of St James, Altham in Lancashire. A plaque commemorating her life is situated adjacent to the Moorfield Colliery Memorial on Burnley Road, Altham, (A678) at the junction with Moorfield Way.

Becker's name and image, alongside those of 58 other women's suffrage supporters, are etched on the plinth of the statue of Millicent Fawcett in Parliament Square, London.

In Paris, France, a street is named after her, the allée Lydia-Becker (Lydia Becker Lane), near Montmartre, close to the rue Eva-Kotchever.  In Chadderton, Manchester, UK a street is named after her, Lydia Becker Way.

Works
 Botany for Novices (1864)
 "Female Suffrage" in The Contemporary Review (1867)
 "Is there any Specific Distinction between Male and Female Intellect?" in Englishwoman's Review of Social and Industrial Questions (1868)
 "On the Study of Science by Women" in The Contemporary Review (1869)
 "The Political Disabilities of Women" in The Westminster Review (1872)

Archives
The archives of Lydia Becker are held at the Women's Library at the Library of the London School of Economics.

Lydia Becker Institute of Immunology and Inflammation 

In 2018 the Lydia Becker Institute of Immunology and Inflammation  was launched at The University of Manchester.

The institute is home to internationally renowned immunology and inflammation expertise in a vast array of basic and applied disciplines. 

The institute is named after Lydia Becker because she was a celebrated natural scientist who conversed with Charles Darwin and because she strongly believed that women were intellectually equal to men and deserved the same opportunities.

Notes

References
 Blackburn, Helen. Women's suffrage: a record of the women's suffrage movement in the British Isles, with biographical sketches of Miss Becker. Charleston: Nabu Press, 2013. (originally published 1902 by Williams & Norgate.) 
 Fulford, Roger. Votes for Women: The Story of a Struggle. London: Faber and Faber Ltd, 1957. .
 Herbet, Michael. Up Then Brave Women: Manchester's Radical Women 1819 – 1918. North West Labour History Society, 2012. 
 Holton, Sandra Stanley. Suffrage Days: Stories from the Women's Suffrage Movement. London: Routledge, 1996. .
 Liddington, Jill and Jill Norris. One Hand Tied Behind Us: The Rise of the Women's Suffrage Movement. London: Virago Limited, 1978. .
 Phillips, Melanie. The Ascent of Woman: A History of the Suffragette Movement and the Ideas Behind It. London: Abacus, 2004. .

Further reading

External links

 Lydia Becker at Spartacus Educational
 "Lydia Becker: Pioneer Orator of the Women's Movement" by Joan Parker in the Manchester Region History Review Vol. 5, No. 2: Autumn/Winter 1991/1992.
 Radical Manchester: Lydia Becker Manchester Central Library, Archives.

1827 births
1890 deaths
19th-century British writers
19th-century British women writers
British women activists
British feminists
British suffragists
British women's rights activists
Deaths from diphtheria
Infectious disease deaths in France
Respiratory disease deaths in France
People from Chadderton
Victorian writers
Women of the Victorian era
National Society for Women's Suffrage